Mộc Hóa is a rural district (huyện) of Long An province in the Mekong Delta region of Vietnam.

In 1963 team A-414 Special Forces set up operations at Kien Tuong.  In 1965 Seabee team 0503 upgraded the outpost to a B camp for team B-41.  In 1966 the camp became home to the Mobile Strike Force(Mike Force) for IV Corps. MACV-SOG ran reconnaissance missions into Cambodia from there and the RVN army took over the base in 1970.

Divisions
Since 2013, the district has been divided into seven communes:

Bình Phong Thạnh
Tân Thành
Tân Lập
Bình Hòa Đông
Bình Hòa Trung
Bình Hòa Tây
Bình Thạnh

In 2003 the district had a population of 67,753 and covered an area of 501 km².  The district capital was at the town also known as Mộc Hóa. In 2013, the town of Mộc Hóa and the nearby communes of Bình Hiệp, Bình Tân, Thạnh Trị and Tuyên Thạnh were separated to create the district-level town of Kiến Tường. The headquarters of the new Mộc Hóa District were moved to Bình Phong Thạnh.

References

Districts of Long An province